Gyokuko Carlson (born Andrea Gass) is a Soto Zen roshi and abbess of Dharma Rain Zen Center in Portland, Oregon, United States.

Biography
She was formerly the co-abbot along with her husband, the late Kyogen Carlson. Carlson and her husband practiced at Shasta Abbey when Jiyu Kennett was the abbess (and from whom she received Dharma transmission), leaving to found their own center in 1986 when celibacy became a requirement at Shasta Abbey. She has been a practitioner of Zen Buddhism for more than thirty years, and is a member of the American Zen Teachers Association.

Gyokuko and Kyogen Carlson have come to be known as the major non-Order of Buddhist Contemplatives line in succession to Jiyu Kennett; their Zen center has become the largest Zen congregation in Oregon.  Carlson's main teaching emphasis is the implementation of spiritual practice into daily life.  Her family religious education program was developed from Unitarian Universalist practices, transformed by Buddhist principles.  It is the largest Buddhist child education program in Oregon, and one of the largest and oldest in the United States.

See also
Great Vow Zen Monastery
Jan Chozen Bays

References

Soto Zen Buddhists
Zen Buddhist nuns
American Zen Buddhists
Religion in Oregon
Clergy from Portland, Oregon
Living people
Buddhist abbesses
Year of birth missing (living people)